Trevorvano Mackey (born January 5, 1992) is a male track and field athlete from Nassau, Bahamas, who mainly competes in the 100m and 200m. Mackey qualified for the 2012 Summer Olympics running a personal best 20.52 over 200m placing 4th at the 2012 NACAC Under-23 Championships in Athletics in Irapuato, Mexico. Mackey is a graduate of Doris Johnson Senior High School in Nassau, Bahamas He competed for South Plains College with compatriot Shavez Hart before transferring to Texas Tech University. They Both teamed up to break the Bahamian 4x100 national record in Morelia, Mexico.

Personal bests

Competition record

References

External links
IAAF Profile
South Plains Profile
London Olympic Profile 
Sports reference biography

1992 births
Living people
Bahamian male sprinters
Olympic athletes of the Bahamas
Athletes (track and field) at the 2012 Summer Olympics
Sportspeople from Nassau, Bahamas
Texas Tech Red Raiders men's track and field athletes